This is a list of the properties and districts — listed as California Historical Landmarks — within Sonoma County, California. 

Note: Click the "Map of all coordinates" link to the right to view a Google map of all properties and districts with latitude and longitude coordinates in the table below.

Listings

|}

See also
List of California Historical Landmarks
National Register of Historic Places listings in Sonoma County, California

References

  
 

+Landmarks  
List of California Historical Landmarks
L01